Nighat Abbass  (born 13 May 1994) is an Indian politician and social activist from Delhi, India. Currently, she is a member and spokesperson of the Bharatiya Janata Party. She filed a petition Delhi High Court for framing Uniform civil code in India.

See also
Politics of India
Mukhtar Abbas Naqvi 
Arif Mohammad Khan

References 

Bharatiya Janata Party politicians from Delhi
People from New Delhi
Living people
Women in Delhi politics
Muslim politics in India
1994 births